Weymann may refer to:

People
Charles Terres Weymann (1889–1976), Haitian-born early aeroplane racing pilot and businessman
Ray Weymann, retired astronomer and astrophysicist, associated with the Carnegie Institution of Washington

Aircraft
Weymann Fabric Bodies, patented design system for fuselages for aircraft and superlight coachwork for motor vehicles
Weymann W-1, French single seat biplane fighter aircraft, built during World War I
Weymann 66, French multipurpose biplane built for colonial work in the 1930s
Weymann W-100, French three seat observation aircraft with a position for the observer within its partially glazed fuselage
Weymann-Lepère WEL-80, French two seat reconnaissance aircraft built to compete for a 1928 government contract

Other
Metro Cammell Weymann, once a major contributor in transportation manufacturing in the UK and Europe
Weymann guitars, one of Americas oldest musical instrument manufacturers

See also
Weyman
Wyman (disambiguation)